Britcher is a surname. Notable people with the surname include:

Samuel Britcher (died  1805), English cricket scorer and archivist
Summer Britcher (born 1994), American luger